The 1964 Stanley Cup Finals was the championship series of the National Hockey League's (NHL) 1963–64 season, and the culmination of the 1964 Stanley Cup playoffs. It was contested between the defending champion Toronto Maple Leafs and the Detroit Red Wings for the second straight year. The Maple Leafs won the best-of-seven series, four games to three, to win the Stanley Cup, their third-straight championship.  As of 2019, this was the last time the Stanley Cup Finals had ended before the month of May. There would not be another game seven at Maple Leaf Gardens for almost three decades.

Paths to the Finals
Toronto defeated the Montreal Canadiens 4–3 to advance to the finals and Detroit defeated the Chicago Black Hawks 4–3.

Game summaries
This series is famous for the courageous play of Bob Baun. In game six of the Final, he took a Gordie Howe slapshot on his ankle and had to leave play. He returned in overtime and scored the winning goal. He also played in game seven despite the pain and only after the series was over, was it revealed that he had played on a fractured ankle.

Until the 2008–09 Final, John MacMillan was the only player to play in back-to-back Finals with different teams in successive series that pitted the same teams against each other.  MacMillan won the Cup with the 1963 Toronto Maple Leafs in a five-game decision over Detroit and then lost the 1964 Cup Final to the Leafs as a member of the Red Wings.

Stanley Cup engraving
The 1964 Stanley Cup was presented to Maple Leafs captain George Armstrong by NHL President Clarence Campbell following the Maple Leafs 4–0 win over the Red Wings in game seven.

The following Maple Leafs players and staff had their names engraved on the Stanley Cup

1963–64 Toronto Maple Leafs

See also
 1963–64 NHL season

Notes

References

 Podnieks, Andrew; Hockey Hall of Fame (2004). Lord Stanley's Cup. Bolton, Ont.: Fenn Pub. pp 12, 50. 

Stanley Cup
Stanley Cup Finals
Detroit Red Wings games
Toronto Maple Leafs games
Stanley Cup Finals
Stanley Cup Finals
Ice hockey competitions in Detroit
Ice hockey competitions in Toronto
Stanley Cup Finals
Stanley Cup